Kobori (written: 小堀) is a Japanese surname. Notable people with the surname include:

, Japanese artist and aristocrat
, Japanese tennis player
, Japanese ice hockey player
, Japanese swimmer
, Japanese swimmer
, Japanese voice actress
, Japanese boxer

See also
7238 Kobori, a main-belt asteroid

Japanese-language surnames